The predominant religion in the Republic of Ireland is Christianity, with the largest denomination being the Catholic Church. The Constitution of Ireland says that the state may not endorse any particular religion and guarantees freedom of religion.

In the 2016 census, 78.3% (3.5 million) of the population identified as Catholic. The next largest group after Catholic was "no religion" at 10%. The second largest Christian denomination, the Church of Ireland (Anglican), declined in membership for most of the twentieth century, but has more recently experienced an increase, as have other small Christian denominations. Other significant Protestant denominations are the Presbyterian Church in Ireland, followed by the Methodist Church in Ireland. The country's Orthodox Christian, Hindu and Muslim populations have experienced significant growth in recent years, due chiefly to immigration, with Orthodox Christianity being the fastest growing religion in Ireland.

Politics

Originally, the 1937 Constitution of Ireland gave the Catholic Church a "special position" as the church of the majority, but also recognised other Christian denominations and Judaism. As with other predominantly Catholic European states, the Irish state underwent a period of legal secularisation in the late twentieth century. In 1972, the article of the Constitution naming specific religious groups, including the Catholic Church, was deleted by the fifth amendment of the constitution in a referendum.

Article 44 remains in the Constitution. It begins:

The article also establishes freedom of religion (for belief, practice, and organisation without undue interference from the state), prohibits endowment of any particular religion, prohibits the state from religious discrimination, and requires the state to treat religious and non-religious schools in a non-prejudicial manner.

Education

Despite a large number of schools in Ireland being run by religious organizations but funded by the state, a general trend of secularism is occurring within the Irish population, particularly in the younger generations.

Many efforts have been made by secular groups to eliminate the rigorous study in the second and sixth classes, to prepare for the sacraments of Holy Communion and confirmation in Catholic schools. Parents can ask for their children to be excluded from religious study if they wish. However, religious studies as a subject was introduced into the state administered Junior Certificate in 2001; it is not compulsory and deals with aspects of different religions, not focusing on one particular religion.

In October 2020, general secretary of Education and Training Boards Ireland Paddy Lavelle confirmed that multidenominational state secondary schools, called State's Education and Training Boards (ETBs) – formerly called vocational schools – were going to phase out a set of Catholic influences such as mandatory graduation masses, displaying Catholic symbols only, and visits from diocesan inspectors, as described in the 'framework for the recognition of religious belief/identities of all students in ETB schools'.

Christianity

Christianity is the largest religion in the Republic of Ireland based on baptisms. Irish Christianity is dominated by the Catholic Church, and Christianity as a whole accounts for 82.3% of the Irish population. Most churches are organized on an all-Ireland basis which includes both Northern Ireland and the Republic of Ireland.
Protestantism in Ireland
Presbyterian Church in Ireland
Methodist Church in Ireland
Eastern Orthodoxy in the Republic of Ireland
The Church of Jesus Christ of Latter-day Saints in Ireland
Irish travellers have traditionally adopted a very particular attitude to the Catholic Church, with a focus on figures such as "healing priests". More generally a tradition of visions continues, often outside of Church sanction.

Evangelical movements have recently spread both within the established churches and outside them. Celtic Christianity has become increasingly popular, again both within and outside established churches.

The patron saints of Ireland for Catholics and Anglicans are Saint Patrick, Saint Brigid and Saint Columba. Saint Patrick is the only one of the three who is commonly recognised as the patron saint. Saint Patrick's Day is celebrated in Ireland and abroad on 17 March.

Eastern Orthodoxy in Ireland is represented mainly by recent immigrants from Eastern European countries, such as Romania, Russia, or Ukraine, and accounts for 1% of the population.

In 2022, 40 percent of Catholics stated they attend church.

Church attendance 

According to a Georgetown University study, the country also has one of the highest rates of regular Mass attendance in the Western World. While daily Mass attendance was 13% in 2006 there had been a reduction in weekly attendance from 81% to 48% between 1990 and 2006, although the decline was reported as leveling off. In the 1970s a survey had given figures at 91%. In 2011, it was reported that weekly Mass attendance in Dublin was on average 18%, with it being lower among younger generations and in some areas less than 2%. A 2012 survey of Irish Catholics undertaken by the Association of Catholic Priests found the weekly mass attendance rate to be 35% on an all-island basis, while daily mass attendance was reported at 3%.

No religion

A 2006 Dentsu poll found that 7% of Ireland had no religion. According to Greeley (2003), 5% of those in Ireland do not believe in God, but only 2% accept the self-identification of "atheist". According to Ingelhart et al. (2004) and Davie (1999), 4% of the Irish do not believe in God.

A 2010 Bishops Conference survey found that 10.1% of Irish Catholics did not believe in God.

According to a 2012 WIN-Gallup International poll, Ireland had the second highest decline in religiosity from 69% in 2005 to 47% in 2012, while those who considered themselves not a religious person increased 25% in 2005 to 44% in 2012. The poll also showed that 10% of Ireland now consider themselves convinced atheists, which is an increase from 2005.

These percentages decreased again, however, from 2012 to 2016, resulting in the pie chart seen below.

Judaism

The earliest recorded presence of Jews in Ireland was in 1062 in the Annals of Inisfallen. As of 2016, the total population listing their religion as Jewish is 2,557.

Islam

Islam is the 6th largest religion in Ireland constituting only 1.33% of the country's population. There are 63,400 practising Muslims living in Ireland and approximately 50 mosques and prayer centres within the State. There is more than one mosque or prayer centre in each province.
Islam has a 60-year long and complex organisational history in Ireland.

Buddhism
The Buddhist population in Ireland is 9,358 (0.2%). Irish Buddhists such as U Dhammaloka are recorded from the late nineteenth century on, with numbers growing particularly in the 21st century.  Beyond formal membership in Theravada, Mahayana, Vajrayana and Western Buddhist groups, there is increasing syncretism, with self-identified Christians and others using Buddhist meditation techniques, Buddha images, texts by figures such as the 14th Dalai Lama and so on. Reputed links between Buddhism and Celtic religion have long played a role in Irish literature. The first Irish Buddhist Union was formed in 2018, with representatives of five Buddhist schools coming together to form the body.

Sikhism
There are approximately 2000 Irish Sikhs with 1,705 officially recorded in the 2016 census.  Most Sikhs in Ireland are based in Dublin, where the Gurdwara, Guru Nanak Darbar is the main place of worship and in recent times has also facilitated a Sikh parade known as the Nagar Kirtan during Vaiskahi celebrations.

Hinduism

Hinduism is a minority faith in Ireland. The 2016 Irish Census reports 14,300 Hindus resident in Ireland, constituting 0.3% of the population of Ireland.

Neo-paganism

Various Neopagan movements are active in Ireland, especially Wicca, Neo-druidry and Celtic Polytheism. Ireland is also a significant point of reference for various kinds of Celtic and other neo-pagan spirituality and religious practice around the world, such as the Fellowship of Isis.

New Age religious movements
New Age religious movements are becoming increasingly significant in Ireland, often as a form of syncretism for members of established religions. Participation is strongly gendered, with a high proportion of women. A typical example is A course in miracles.

Demographics

Census Information

Between 2006 and 2011, Catholics decreased as a percentage of the population, but still showed a robust increase in absolute numbers due both to an excess of births over deaths as well as immigration from countries such as Poland. Most recently, Protestantism, including the Church of Ireland, has experienced a massive decrease in percentage, despite having earlier experienced some recovery, chiefly due to immigration from the UK and Nigeria. Those declaring no religion, Eastern Orthodoxy, and Islam showed significant increases.

Notes

Going by the recent 2016 figures,
 84.6% of the Irish population are Christian
 1.3% of the Irish population are Muslim
 and 10% of the Irish population have no religion
 Eurobarometer Polls
According to a 2010 Eurobarometer Poll,

 70% of Irish citizens answered that "they believe there is a God"
 20% answered that "they believe there is some sort of spirit or life force"
 7% answered that "they do not believe there is any sort of spirit, God, or life force"

According to a 2012 Eurobarometer Poll when people were shown a card listing options for religious identification:

 92% of Irish citizens answered that they are Christian (88% Catholic).
 5% answered that they are non-believers or agnostic.
 2% answered that they are atheists.
 1% answered in some other way .

See also
 Catholic Church in Ireland
 Christianity in Ireland
 Irish Catholics
 Protestant decline in Ireland (19th–20th centuries)
 Protestantism in Ireland
 Religion in Northern Ireland
 Religion in the United Kingdom
 Secularism in the Republic of Ireland

References

 
Culture of the Republic of Ireland